Michael Wade Wessel (born December 2, 1977) is an American mixed martial artist who last competed in 2016. A professional competitor since 2007, Wessel formerly competed for the Ultimate Fighting Championship, Bellator, and was a contestant on The Ultimate Fighter: Heavyweights.

Background
Born and raised in Celina, Ohio, Wessel played football at Celina High School as a defensive tackle and was talented, earning a scholarship to the University of St. Francis where he played nose tackle. Wessel also went to training camps for both the Kansas City Chiefs and San Diego Chargers but was cut in both appearances. Wessel later competed for Arena Football League teams in North Dakota and San Diego for three-and-a-half seasons before accepting a strength and conditioning coaching job at the University of Arkansas. It was during his time in Arkansas when Wessel began to train mixed martial arts.

Mixed martial arts

Ultimate Fighting Championship
He made his UFC debut against Antoni Hardonk at UFC 92.  He accepted the fight on a week notice after Hardonk's original opponent dropped out due to injury. UFC's Dana White offered the fight to Wessel and he quickly accepted, signing a four-fight deal. Wessel lost in the second round via TKO stoppage after tiring from only having a few days to train.

The Ultimate Fighter
After losing to Hardonk in his UFC debut, Wessel took a spot on the Spike TV reality show, The Ultimate Fighter: Heavyweights. He was the last pick for Team Rashad Evans. Wessel had his first fight on the show against Marcus Jones, losing via first round submission armbar.

Wessel was not given a chance to fight on the finale card. After losing to Jones, Wessel was released from his contract.

Post-UFC
Wessel's first fight after his stint on The Ultimate Fighter: Heavyweights, was against another Ultimate Fighter alumni, Dan Christison. Wessel lost the fight via submission kimura.

Wessel also faced Bellator's veteran Scott Barrett and Strikeforce's veteran Matt Kovacs, losing against Barrett and winning against Kovacs.

In the second half of 2012, Wessel signed with Bellator.

Bellator MMA
Wessel made his debut on August 24, 2012 at Bellator 73 against fellow newcomer Ryan Martinez. He won via split decision (29-28 Wessel, 30-27 Martinez, 29-28 Wessel).

Wessel next entered the Bellator season seven heavyweight tournament, facing Rich Hale on October 5, 2012 at Bellator 75 for a spot in the semifinals. Hale defeated Wessel via TKO in the first round.

Wessel faced Alexei Kudin on December 7, 2012 at Bellator 83. He won via unanimous decision (29-28, 29-28, 29-28).

Wessel then faced Justin Frazier at Bellator 120 on May 17, 2014. He defeated Frazier via first round TKO.

Wessel faced Josh Diekmann at Bellator 123 on September 5, 2014. He lost the fight via knockout in the first round.

Wessel faced Frank Tate at Bellator 162 on October 21, 2016. He won the fight via unanimous decision.

Mixed martial arts record

|-
|Win
|align=center|15–8
|Frank Tate
|Decision (unanimous)
|Bellator 162
|
|align=center|3
|align=center|5:00
|Memphis, Tennessee, United States
|
|-
|Loss
|align=center|14–8
|Josh Diekmann
|KO (punches)
|Bellator 123
|
|align=center|1
|align=center|0:47
|Uncasville, Connecticut, United States
|
|-
|Win
|align=center|14–7
|Justin Frazier
|TKO (punches)
|Bellator 120
|
|align=center|1
|align=center|4:28
|Southaven, Mississippi, United States
|
|-
|Loss
|align=center|13–7
|Michal Kita
|TKO (punches)
|Pro MMA Challenge 1: Drwal vs. Heleno
|
|align=center|1
|align=center|2:11
|Wroclaw, Poland
|
|-
|Loss
|align=center|13–6
|Robert Neal
|TKO (punches)
|PFMMAC: PrizeFight MMA Championships
|
|align=center|1
|align=center|0:13
|Tunica, Mississippi, United States
|For the PrizeFight Heavyweight Championship.
|-
|Win
|align=center|13–5
|Alexei Kudin
|Decision (unanimous)
|Bellator 83
|
|align=center|3
|align=center|5:00
|Atlantic City, New Jersey, United States
|
|-
|Loss
|align=center|12–5
|Rich Hale
|TKO (punches)
|Bellator 75
|
|align=center|1
|align=center|1:19
|Hammond, Indiana, United States
|Bellator Season Seven Heavyweight Tournament Quarterfinal.
|-
|Win
|align=center|12–4
|Ryan Martinez
|Decision (split)
|Bellator 73
|
|align=center|3
|align=center|5:00
|Tunica Resorts, Mississippi, United States
|
|-
|Win
|align=center|11–4
|Matt Kovacs
|TKO (punches)
|SF: ShoFight 20
|
|align=center|2
|align=center|4:50
|Springfield, Missouri, United States
|
|-
|Loss
|align=center|10–4
|Scott Barrett
|TKO (punches)
|SportFight X: Middle Tennessee Mayhem
|
|align=center|1
|align=center|3:53
|Murfreesboro, Tennessee, United States
|
|-
|Win
|align=center|10–3
|Chris Hawk
|TKO (punches)
|AXC 10: War of the Machines 
|
|align=center|1
|align=center|2:19
|Little Rock, Arkansas, United States
|
|-
|Win
|align=center|9–3
|Jack Armstrong
|TKO (punches)
|AXC 8: Friday Fury
|
|align=center|1
|align=center|2:39
|Little Rock, Arkansas, United States
|
|-
|Loss
|align=center|8–3
|Dan Christison
|Submission (kimura)
|CFC 4: Wessel vs. Christison
|
|align=center|3
|align=center|3:56
|Winnipeg, Manitoba, Canada
|
|-
|Loss
|align=center|8–2
|Antoni Hardonk
|TKO (punches)
|UFC 92
|
|align=center|2
|align=center|2:09
|Las Vegas, Nevada, United States
|
|-
|Win
|align=center|8–1
|Aaron Winterlee
|Submission
|Subzero Fighting
|
|align=center|1
|align=center|1:59
|Little Rock, Arkansas, United States
|
|-
|Win
|align=center|7–1
|Rudy Lindsey
|Decision (unanimous)
|Extreme Fighting League
|
|align=center|2
|align=center|5:00
|Oklahoma, United States
|
|-
|Win
|align=center|6–1
|Patrick Castillo
|Decision (split)
|AOW: GIs vs. Pros
|
|align=center|3
|align=center|5:00
|Tunica, Mississippi, United States
|
|-
|Win
|align=center|5–1
|Mark Bier
|TKO (punches)
|Ring Rulers
|
|align=center|1
|align=center|0:45
|Shreveport, Louisiana, United States
|
|-
|Win
|align=center|4–1
|Matt Thomas
|TKO (punches)
|Subzero Fighting
|
|align=center|1
|align=center|N/A
|Little Rock, Arkansas, United States
|
|-
|Win
|align=center|3–1
|Matt Thomas
|KO (punches)
|AOW: Art of War 4
|
|align=center|1
|align=center|2:42
|Tunica, Mississippi, United States
|
|-
|Loss
|align=center|2–1
|Aaron Wintterle 
|KO (punch)
|Xtreme Fighting League
|
|align=center|2
|align=center|0:28
|Alabama, United States
|
|-
|Win
|align=center|2–0
|Rudy Lindsey 
|Decision (unanimous)
|Xtreme Fighting League
|
|align=center|3
|align=center|2:00
|Alabama, United States
|
|-
|Win
|align=center|1–0
|Jason Lee 
|TKO (punches) 
|Xtreme Fighting League
|
|align=center|3
|align=center|1:18
|Alabama, United States
|

Mixed martial arts exhibition record

|-
|Loss
|align=center|0–1
|Marcus Jones
|Submission (armbar)
|The Ultimate Fighter: Heavyweights
|
|align=center|1
|
|Las Vegas, Nevada, United States
|
|-

References

External links
 
 
 Ingrid Norton's coverage of Wessel's early MMA career at The Arkansas Democrat-Gazette

American male mixed martial artists
Heavyweight mixed martial artists
1977 births
Living people
Sportspeople from Ohio
People from Celina, Ohio
 Mixed martial artists from Ohio
Ultimate Fighting Championship male fighters